Hlavatý (feminine Hlavatá) is a Czech surname. Notable people include:

 Jana Hlavaty (born 1941), Czech-born American skier
 Lillian Hlavaty (1932–2009), American baseball player
 Lukáš Hlavatý (born 1983), Czech football midfielder
 Neil Hlavaty (born 1986), American association football player 
 Václav Hlavatý (1894–1969), Czech-American mathematician

Czech-language surnames